Sean D. Kirkland is an American philosopher and associate professor of philosophy at DePaul University. 
He is known for his expertise on Ancient Greek Philosophy.
Kirkland won the 2013 Symposium Book Award for his monograph The Ontology of Socratic Questioning in Platos Early Dialogues.

Books
 The Ontology of Socratic Questioning in Platos Early Dialogues, SUNY Press, 2012
 The Returns of Antigone: Interdisciplinary Essays, co-edited with Tina Chanter, SUNY Press, 2014
 Aristotle and Tragic Temporality (forthcoming)
 A Companion to Ancient Philosophy, co-edited with Eric Sanday, Northwestern University Press (forthcoming)

References

External links
 Sean D. Kirkland at DePaul University

21st-century American philosophers
Continental philosophers
Philosophers of religion
Heidegger scholars
Philosophy academics
Stony Brook University alumni
DePaul University faculty
Living people
American scholars of ancient Greek philosophy
Date of birth missing (living people)
Year of birth missing (living people)